Blancard may refer to:

  (1774–1853), general of the 1st French Empire
  (1914–2008), French engineer and high-ranking official
 Louis Blancard (1831–1902), French archivist and numismatist
 Pierre Blancard (1741–1826), French botanist and explorer
 René Blancard (1897–1965), French film actor and screenwriter
 Saint-Blancard, a commune located in the Gers department of France